Lewisepeira is a genus of orb-weaver spiders first described by Herbert Walter Levi in 1993.

Species
 it contains four species from the Americas and the Caribbean:
Lewisepeira boquete Levi, 1993 – Panama
Lewisepeira chichinautzin Levi, 1993 – Mexico
Lewisepeira farri (Archer, 1958) – Jamaica
Lewisepeira maricao Levi, 1993 – Puerto Rico

References

Araneidae
Araneomorphae genera
Spiders of North America